Chris Casey (born October 15, 1963) is an American college basketball coach. Most recently, he was the head coach of the Niagara Purple Eagles men's basketball team. On March 11, 2019, he was released. He finished at Niagara with a six-year record of 64–129. He is currently an assistant coach at Fairfield.

NCAA Division I head coaching record

NCAA DIII

NCAA DII

|-
| style="background: #e6e6e6; text-align:center;" colspan="6" | LIU Post (East Coast Conference) (2010–2013)
|-

NCAA DI

References

1963 births
Living people
American men's basketball coaches
American men's basketball players
Basketball coaches from New York (state)
Basketball players from New York (state)
Central Connecticut Blue Devils men's basketball coaches
Central Connecticut State University alumni 
College men's basketball head coaches in the United States
LIU Post Pioneers men's basketball coaches
Niagara Purple Eagles men's basketball coaches
Saint Peter's Peacocks men's basketball coaches
St. Francis Brooklyn Terriers men's basketball coaches
St. John's Red Storm men's basketball coaches
Western Connecticut State Colonials men's basketball players